or CUJ was founded in 1969 by Takeuchi Naokazu. CUJ is certified as a non-profit organization by Japan's NPO legislation. With offices in Nishi-Waseda, Tokyo, CUJ publishes "Consumer Report" as a member newsletter, as well as an online service in Japanese.

CUJ has been an associate member of Consumers International since 1972, promoting consumer protection in Japan.

History
In 1971, CUJ invited US consumer advocate Ralph Nader to Japan for a workshop. Early campaigns had a distinct focus on food safety and environmental concerns, including class action lawsuits against illegal oil industry cartels. CUJ was an early opponent of nuclear power and food irradiation in Japan, holding various events throughout the country during the anti-nuclear power action week in 1977. CUJ has supported the campaign to stop the Rokkasho Reprocessing Plant in the Aomori Prefecture.

In 1982, CUJ called for an end to liberalization of agricultural products. The campaign was called, "Yes to Complete Grain Self-sufficiency" and in 1985 CUJ organized meetings of rice farmers and consumers to discuss how to protect rice production in Japan from pressure to liberalize Japan’s rice market, in order to restore Japan’s food self-sufficiency. CUJ has also protested imports of whale meat from Norway, noting that PCB contents were 7.6 times the Japanese government's maximum permissible level.

Genetically Modified Food
Since 1996, CUJ has been the center of the opposition to genetically modified food (GMO) in Japan, starting the "No! GMO" Campaign, and demanding mandatory labeling of all GMO foods.

BSE Controversy
In 2005, CUJ was highly critical of the resumption of imports to Japan of beef from the United States due to fears about BSE. "This conclusion was made politically and hastily in response to the American demand that we resume beef imports from the United States," said Yasuaki Yamaura to CBS News. In June, 2006, he also noted to Reuters: "Safety inspection by Japan at U.S. meatpacking plants is merely nominal and superficial..."

US beef imports in Japan were stopped from the United States in December 2003. In December 2005, Japan once again allowed imports of U.S. beef, but reinstated the ban in January 2006 after a technical violation of the U.S.-Japan beef import agreement. In order to protect Japanese consumers from mad cow disease, only meat from cattle that is less than 21 months old is accepted; and spinal cords, vertebrae, brains and bone marrow must be removed.

Michiko Kamiyama from Food Safety Citizen Watch and Yoko Tomiyama, Consumers Union of Japan, said about this: "The government has put priority on the political schedule between the two countries, not on food safety or human health."

References

External links
Consumers Union of Japan - Official site

Consumer organizations in Japan
Members of Consumers International